Apolo Robin Nsibambi (25 October 1940 – 28 May 2019) was a Ugandan academic and politician who served as the 8th Prime Minister of Uganda from 5 April 1999 until 24 May 2011, when Amama Mbabazi succeeded him.

Early life and education
Apolo Robin Nsibambi was born on 25 October 1940. He was one of 12 children born to Eva Bakaluba and Semyoni Nsibambi, a leader in the Balokole movement or the "East African Revival". Apolo Nsibambi attended King's College Budo for his high school education. He held a Bachelor of Science degree in economics, with honors, from the Makerere University. He also held a Master of Arts degree in political science from the University of Chicago in the United States. His Doctor of Philosophy degree was obtained from the University of Nairobi.

Career
Nsibambi served as the dean of Faculty of Social Science at Makerere University from 1978 until 1983 and from 1985 until 1987. He was appointed head of the Department of Political Science at Makerere University in 1987, a position he held until 1990. He was Director of the Makerere Institute of Social Research from 1994 to 1996.

Between 1996 and 1998, he served as Minister of Public Service in the Uganda Cabinet. In 1998 he was appointed Minister of Education and Sports, serving in that capacity until 1999 when he was appointed Prime Minister and Leader of Government Business in Parliament.

Nsibambi also served as the chancellor of Makerere University from 2003 until October 2007. He taught at the university in the 1960s, befriending author Paul Theroux, who interviewed Nsibambi in his travelogue Dark Star Safari.

Personal life
He married Esther Nsibambi in March 2003 after the death of his first wife, Rhoda, in December 2001. He was the father of four daughters. He was a practising Anglican. Nsibambi died on 28 May 2019, at the age of 78.

See also

Politics of Uganda
Cabinet of Uganda
Parliament of Uganda

References

External links
Minister Says Nsibambi Was Better Than Mbabazi
Official Website of the Office of the Prime Minister
Official Website of the Parliament of Uganda

1940 births
2019 deaths
Academic staff of Makerere University
National Resistance Movement politicians
Prime Ministers of Uganda
University of Chicago alumni
University of Nairobi alumni
Ganda people
Alumni of the University of London
Ugandan Anglicans
People from Wakiso District
Academic staff of Victoria University Uganda
Deaths from pulmonary embolism
Fellows of Uganda National Academy of Sciences